The Bảo Định canal (kênh Bảo Định, Bảo Định Hà) also called the Bảo Định river (Bảo Định Giang, sông Bảo Định) is a part-natural, part-man made waterway in the Mekong Delta in Vietnam. It is in places also named the Vũng Gù canal (kênh Vũng Gù, (sông Vũng Gù).

The canal runs from the Vàm Cỏ Tay river at Tân An to the Tiền River at Mỹ Tho.

History
The waterway first began to be manually improved in the rulership of Nguyễn Phúc Chu (1675–1725). The canal was substantially deepened and extended in the reign of Gia Long, with 9,000 workers being mobilised to connect the two rivers around 1819.

References

History of Vietnam
Canals in Vietnam
Ship canals
Buildings and structures in An Giang province
Geography of An Giang province
Rivers of An Giang province
Canals opened in 1705
1705 establishments in Vietnam
Rivers of Vietnam